Carnarvon is a coastal town situated approximately  north of Perth, in Western Australia. It lies at the mouth of the Gascoyne River on the Indian Ocean. The popular Shark Bay world heritage area lies to the south of the town and the Ningaloo Reef and the popular tourist town of Exmouth lie to the north. Within Carnarvon is the Mungullah Aboriginal Community. Inland, Carnarvon has strong links with the town of Gascoyne Junction and the Burringurrah Community. At the 2021 census, Carnarvon had a population of 4,879.

History 
The Inggarda people are the traditional owners of the region around Carnarvon. Before European settlement the place now called Carnarvon, located at the mouth of the Gascoyne River, was known as Kuwinywardu which means "neck of water". Australian-Aboriginals associating with the Carnarvon area typically associate as being Yamatji, traditionally speaking the Wajarri language.

The town was founded in 1883, initially as a port and supply centre for the surrounding region, and is the administrative centre for the Shire of Carnarvon. The town site was officially gazetted on 4 June 1891, named after Henry Herbert, 4th Earl of Carnarvon, a past Secretary of State for the Colonies.

Carnarvon has had three tramways.
 The first, shown on a Public Works Department map of 1884, ran from a landing site on the river, across Olivia Terrace to a shed on the other side of the road - A very short tramway indeed. The trolley used on this tramway was supposed to be hand powered, using a lever attached to crank on two of the wheels. However, there is a reference to the use of wind-power.
 The second tramway, constructed between 1886 and 1887, ran west from Olivia Terrace in a straight line to the jetty, which was halfway between Mangrove Point and Conspicuous Clump. It was horse drawn.
 The third, and partially remaining, tramway was completed on 9 November 1900. It runs from the townsite, across Babbage Island to the deep-sea jetty. It was 2 miles 5 chains (3.3 km) long. Due to the heavy loads of wool being carried on what was a very light railway, it was decided to convert the tramway to  gauge in 1908–09. This tramway was worked with a steam locomotive. The tramway ceased operation in December 1965.

The Carnarvon Light Railway Association operated trains along restored tracks on the jetty; however, due to unsafe conditions the jetty was closed to the public. In 2021, it was destroyed by Cyclone Seroja.

Aerospace 

During the 1960s, NASA set up a tracking station nearby to support the Gemini and Apollo space programs. The tracking station was closed in the mid-1970s. Only the foundations of the historical site remain. The site is adjacent to the OTC Satellite Earth Station Carnarvon.

Korean Star
On 20 May 1988, the bulk carrier Korean Star ran aground in bad weather near Cape Cuvier, within the port limits of Carnarvon. Around  of fuel oil were spilled into the ocean. The ship was not salvaged and left grounded; however, very little of the wreck remains to be seen.

December 2010 floods 
See December 2010 Gascoyne River flood

Economy
Main economic activities of the Gascoyne region include:
 mining, at a salt mine on nearby Lake Macleod and at inland mines
 fishing (major focus is a prawn fishery)
 tourism
 agriculture, including cattle, goats, sheep and wool, and horticulture, the major industry of the area. A range of products are grown along the Gascoyne River, particularly bananas (mainly Cavendish bananas) and tomatoes, as well as grapefruit, mangoes and table grapes. Climatic advantages enable the growers to meet out of season demand both locally and in export markets.

Radio Australia had a shortwave relay station (built during the 1970s) that used to relay programming to Europe, South Asia and Southeast Asia.

Education 
There are five schools in the town; one Catholic, three Western Australia Department of Education schools and one independent. These are St Mary's Star of the Sea Catholic School, which was built in 1906, Carnarvon Community College (formerly Carnarvon Primary School, East Carnarvon Primary School, and Carnarvon Senior High School), Carnarvon School of the Air and Carnarvon Christian School.

Climate 
Carnarvon has a warm arid climate (BWh). Occasional tropical cyclones affect Carnarvon during the summer months bringing heavy rain and strong winds. Apart from this erratic source of rainfall summers are normally dry. The town is extremely sunny, having 211.0 clear days annually.

Notable people
 Andrew Broad, Australian politician
 Troy Cook, Australian rules footballer (Sydney Swans, Fremantle Dockers)
 Craig Fong, actor
 Shelley Gare, journalist and author
 Daniel Johnson, basketball player (Melbourne Tigers, Adelaide 36ers)
 Michael Mitchell, Australian rules footballer (Richmond Tigers)
 Keith Murdoch, New Zealand Rugby union player (All Blacks, Otago), spent his final years in Carnarvon
 Cleo Smith, 2021 missing person (aged four at the time)
 Tom Vandeleur, Australian rules footballer (Fremantle Dockers rookie)
 Jay Watson, Australian musician (Tame Impala, Pond)

See also
 Carnarvon Airport (Australia)

References

External links

 Shire of Carnarvon
 Australian Places - Carnarvon
 Carnarvon Flood Photos 2010 - ABC Last accessed 22 December 2010

Coastal towns in Western Australia
Shire of Carnarvon
Populated places established in 1883
Port cities and towns of the Indian Ocean
Port cities in Western Australia
Spaceports